Leggett may refer to:

Places
 Leggett, California, a town in California, USA
 Leggett, North Carolina, a town in North Carolina, USA
 Leggett, Texas, a town in Texas, USA

Other uses
 Leggett (surname)
 Leggett & Platt, a manufacturing company
 Francis H. Leggett, a ship commissioned in 1903
 Leggett or Leggett's, a former upscale department store chain with stores in Norfolk, Virginia and other Hampton Roads cities; now part of Belk
 in Physics and Quantum Theory Leggett inequality

See also
 Legget
 Legge
 Leggatt (disambiguation)
 Liggett (disambiguation)